WJEH-FM (93.1 FM, "93.1 The Wolf") is an American radio station licensed to serve the community of Racine, Ohio. The station is owned by Thomas Susman, through licensee Vandalia Media Partners 2, LLC. It airs a new country music format.

History
The station was assigned the call letters WJEH-FM on January 27, 2020, and formerly the WNTO call letters by the Federal Communications Commission on July 5, 2006. It was formerly licensed to Ravenswood, West Virginia, prior to being granted a construction permit in 2005 to change its city of license to Racine.

Programming
WJEH-FM is the only station in their broadcast area that is both locally programmed and locally owned. The station covers Gallipolis, Pomeroy, Point Pleasant, Ravenswood, and Ripley. They play new country music exclusively and feature a number of listener-oriented promotions. The station's morning show, The  Rise and Shine Show, began on July 1, 2014, and is hosted by longtime area personality Tina Diddle. It features giveaways and a wide range of discussion, plus music from today's country hits.

References

External links
 Official website

JEH-FM
Country radio stations in the United States
Gallia County, Ohio
Meigs County, Ohio
Radio stations established in 1997
1997 establishments in West Virginia